Vice Admiral Sir Ian Murray Robertson Campbell,  (8 August 1898 – 15 April 1980) was a Royal Navy officer who served as Commander-in-Chief, South Atlantic Station from 1954 to 1956.

Naval career
Promoted to captain in 1940, Campbell served in the Second World War in the Arctic Convoys commanding the destroyer  from 1942 to 1944 and then becoming deputy director of naval intelligence. He was appointed Flag Officer Liaison for the Middle East in 1950, and Flag Officer Flotillas in the Mediterranean Fleet in 1952. He then became Flag Officer Commanding the Reserve Fleet in 1953, and Commander-in-Chief, South Atlantic Station in 1954, before retiring in 1956.

Further reading
 The Kola Run. A record of Arctic convoys, 1941–1945 by Admiral Sir Ian Campbell and Captain Donald MacIntyre

References

|-

1898 births
1980 deaths
Companions of the Distinguished Service Order
Companions of the Order of the Bath
Knights Commander of the Order of the British Empire
Royal Navy vice admirals